Judicael (or Yezekael) (died 888 or 889) was the Duke of Brittany from 876 to his death. He was a son of a daughter of Erispoe and claimed Brittany after the death of the pretenders Wrhwant and Pascweten in mid 876.

During the reign of Salomon (857–874), Judicael controlled either all of Cornouaille or just Poher (Poucaer) with the title of princeps Poucher. He represented western Breton interests against those of the powerful rulers of Vannes, Pascweten and then Alan the Great, who opposed his claim to the Breton dukedom.

Judicael reconciled with Alan to fight the Vikings, however. Together, they defeated the raiders at the Battle of Questembert in 888 or 889, but Judicael lost his life in the fighting.

See also
 Dukes of Brittany family tree

References

Sources
Smith, Julia M. H. Province and Empire: Brittany and the Carolingians. Cambridge University Press: 1992.

880s deaths
9th-century rulers of Brittany
Dukes of Brittany
Military personnel killed in action
Year of birth unknown